Antonia Padoani Bembo (c. 1640 – c. 1720) was an Italian composer and singer.

Life
She was born in Venice,  the daughter of Giacomo Padoani (1603–1666), a doctor, and Diana Paresco (1609–1676); she married the Venetian noble Lorenzo Bembo (1637–1703) in 1659. She had three children. She moved to Paris before 1676, possibly to leave a bad marriage. There she sang for Louis XIV. Louis granted her a pension and housing at the Petite Union Chrétienne des Dames de Saint Chaumont, a religious community.

She was a contemporary of Élisabeth Jacquet de La Guerre and Barbara Strozzi.

Oeuvre
Six volumes of Bembo's music survive in manuscript at the Bibliothèque nationale de France as the Produzioni armoniche, most of them dedicated to Louis XIV. These contain a certain amount of autobiographical information, which has been corroborated through other sources. She was taught by Francesco Cavalli (who also taught Barbara Strozzi) by 1654 and wrote in all the major genres of the time, including opera, secular and sacred cantatas, and petit and grand motets. Her work is a combination of French and Italian styles. She uses the virtuosic elements of Italian style of the period, as well as French dance forms. Much of her work is for soprano voice with continuo accompaniment. She wrote an opera called L'Ercole amante (1707), to a libretto by Francesco Buti.

List of works
 Produzioni armoniche, 41 arias and cantatas in Italian, French, and Latin. (vol. I)
 Te Deum for 3 voices (vol. II, dedicated to Marie Adélaïde of Savoy in 1704)
 Serenata for 5 voices (vol. II)
 2 mottetti (vol. III)
 Te Deum for 5 voices (vol. III)
 Salmo XIX, for 3 voices (vol. III)
 Ercole amante, opera set to a libretto by Francesco Buti (1707) (vols. IV-V)
  (vol. VI) (Seven Psalms of David)

Recordings 

 The Seven Psalms of David, Vol. I (2004), La Donna Musicale
 The Seven Psalms of David, Vol. II (2005), La Donna Musicale

The texts for these psalms were written by Élisabeth Sophie Chéron.

References
Claire Fontijn, Marinella Laini. "Antonia Bembo", Grove Music Online, ed. L. Macy (accessed September 18, 2006), grovemusic.com (subscription access).
Pendle, Karin. Women and Music: A History. Indiana University Press, Bloomington IN. (2001) 
Claire Fontijn, Desperate Measures: The Life and Music of Antonia Padoani Bembo. Oxford University Press. (2006)

Notes

Italian Baroque composers
1640s births
1720s deaths
Italian women classical composers
18th-century Italian composers
18th-century Italian women singers
Antonia
18th-century women composers